Party of Hungarians of Ukraine (KMKSZ) is a Hungarian party in Zakarpattia Oblast, Western Ukraine, which was founded in February 2005. It holds 8 seats on the Zakarpattia Oblast Council. The Hungarian Cultural Federation in Transcarpathia (KMKSZ) is associated with the political party.

The party is also allied with the governing party of Hungary, Fidesz.

Election results

Zakarpattia Oblast Council

See also
 Hungarians in Ukraine

External links
 
 УБОЗ
 Відсотки партії Угорців
 Про Миколу Ковача

References

2005 establishments in Ukraine
Political parties established in 2005
Political parties in Ukraine
Zakarpattia Oblast
 
Hungarian minority interests parties